Ikhin, or Arokho, is an Edoid language of Edo State, Nigeria.

Ikhin is spoken in the Ikhin area of Owan East LGA, Edo State.

Its phonology and lexicon have been described in two University of Ibadan linguistics dissertations.

References

Edoid languages